Lisa: The Painful is a 2014 post-apocalyptic role-playing video game developed and published by American indie studio Dingaling Productions. The game was written, designed, and composed by Austin Jorgensen, and was released for Windows, OS X, and Linux on December 15, 2014. Lisa: The Painful is the second installment in Lisa Trilogy, preceded by Lisa: The First (2012) and was followed by the game Lisa: The Joyful (2015).

In Lisa: The Painful, the player controls Brad Armstrong, a balding, middle-aged man with a troubled past who journeys through the wasteland of Olathe in search of Buddy, his adoptive daughter. Along the way, he is forced to make choices that permanently affect both his own well-being and that of his party members. The game received mostly positive reviews, with praise for its darkly comedic writing and soundtrack.

Gameplay 

Lisa features a combination of traditional turn-based RPG combat in a 2D side-scrolling overworld. Brad and certain party members are addicted to a drug named Joy that can drastically increase their power, but gives them serious withdrawals when unused. The overworld features an assortment of settlements with shops and bars, where potential party members can often be found. There are thirty different possible companions, but all of them except for Brad are susceptible to permanent death through either scripted events such as Russian Roulette or against certain enemies, who will occasionally use permanent-kill moves.

In battle, Brad and some of his companions are able to use combination attacks using the "Dial Combo" system, allowing the player to press a sequence of keys to use powerful attacks like fireballs. Other party members use a variety of techniques for both offense and defense, and apply status effects such as stunning or paralysis. Each party member has a different playstyle; for example, the anti-Joy crusader Ajeet's standard attacks are various Pokes that do no damage but provide guaranteed status effects on the enemy, and as such his only method of direct damage is through his special moves.

Throughout the game, Brad is forced to make choices that affect the core mechanics of gameplay. Depending on the player's choices, Brad can lose one or both of his arms, or some of his party members. The loss of Brad's arms drastically lowers his stats and increases his Joy withdrawal frequency. Without any arms Brad cannot use his Armstrong Style at all and can only bite at opponents (though certain skills can still be selected).

Plot 
At the start of the game, the player controls a child named Bradley Armstrong. The departure of his mother leads to Bradley and his younger sister, Lisa, to be abused and neglected by their father, Marty Armstrong.
Following an unseen cataclysmic event known as "The Flash", Brad, now a middle-aged ex-martial arts instructor, lives with his friends in a post-apocalypse devoid of women (and therefore a manner in which for humanity to reproduce). One day Brad discovers a baby girl laying in the wasteland, to which his friends plead for him to give the child to Rando, a famous warlord commanding a vast army of soldiers. Brad refuses, instead raising the young girl he christens "Buddy" in secret. She is eventually found and kidnapped, leading Brad to embark across Olathe to rescue her.

During his quest to find Buddy, Brad meets many different characters, some of whom may be recruited as party members by the player to be used in combat.
Throughout the game, flashback scenes depict a pre-apocalyptic Olathe, shedding light on Brad's early life, including his upbringing alongside his younger sister Lisa and their relationship with Marty.
Brad also repeatedly encounters a man called Buzzo, who forces him to make serious choices which have permanent gameplay consequences. Buzzo is also responsible for spreading an addictive drug named Joy across the wasteland. The drug is said to make the user "feel nothing", however it eventually causes its users to become deformed, mindless creatures known as Joy Mutants.

Brad and Buddy are later reunited, and Brad realizes that Buddy left on her own due to Brad's controlling nature. Brad still decides to take Buddy back to their home, but he is cornered by Buzzo and his gang, who knock him out and force-feed him Joy in front of his daughter. Brad has a Joy-induced blackout, and when he wakes up he finds that Buzzo, his group, and Buddy are gone. Despite realizing Buddy's distaste towards him, Brad pushes forwards, with his past trauma causing him to desperately fear that harm will befall Buddy. After hearing that Buddy stole a boat and presumably went out to sea, Brad makes one of his own, and while his party members are asleep, sets off alone. He finds Buddy on a desolate island, being cared for by an aged Marty, whom Brad promptly kills in a Joy fueled rage. When Buddy escapes yet again, he uses a corpse as a flotation device to follow her.

When he reaches land, Brad encounters Rando, who found Buddy and took her under the care of him and his forces. Unexpectedly, Brad's party members arrive, and try to convince him to stop and let Rando take care of Buddy. Seeing this as a sort of aggression and opposition, Brad kills his party members. Despite the odds, Brad massacres Rando's forces, and then Rando himself. Brad finally reaches Buddy, and she blames him for ruining her chances at freedom alongside Rando. The game then briefly allows the player to control Buddy rather than Brad, a technique akin to a point-of-view change in a novel. As Brad dies, he asks if he did the right thing, and the player chooses whether Buddy hugs him or not in response (a choice which has no further gameplay or story impact). Brad then falls over, apparently dead. After the credits it is revealed that Brad has transformed into a Joy Mutant. The ending the player receives depends on whether they elected to play on Pain Mode or use the drug Joy.

Lisa: The Joyful 
The game's DLC chapter takes place immediately after the end of the second game. It is revealed that Rando was not killed in his battle with Brad. He accompanies Buddy as she tries to become the most powerful person in Olathe by killing the warlords ruling it, despite Rando's disapproval. Following the kidnapping of Buddy by associates of Rando alongside Buddy's slaughter of a village inhabited by pacifists, Rando leaves Buddy, presumably due to his distaste for the senselessness of the violence she seeks to unleash upon Olathe. Rando is subsequently captured by a man by the name of Bolo Bugaughtiichi, who utilizes him as bait in an ultimately unsuccessful effort to capture, and rape, Buddy. Regardless of player choice, Bolo is unsuccessful, and is killed: either by Buddy or by a mutated creature nicknamed "Sweetheart". After Rando is horribly injured in the fall from the trap, he reveals that he was behind the kidnapping in an attempt to keep Buddy safe and protected. Buddy, in a violent rage, kills Rando.

Afterwards, Buddy suffers from various hallucinations, implied to be the byproduct of the drug "Joy" appear taking the form of Brad, the protagonist of The Painful and Rando.

After defeating all of the game's warlords, Buddy confronts a man named Dr. Yado, a trumpet-playing professor who is seen in secret locations as an easter egg in The Painful. Yado is a mad scientist who created Joy, and likely caused the Flash. He used Buzzo to spread Joy throughout Olathe in an attempt to destroy post-Flash civilization, with the end goal being that he could rule the world. The last part in his plan now is to murder Buddy, the one force strong enough to bring him down. Buddy is suddenly ambushed by Sweetheart before being saved by Buzzo, who informs her Yado has a vaccine that will prevent her from becoming a Joy Mutant. After Yado's defeat, he begins to verbally confront Buddy, revealing himself to be her biological father and asserts that he has control over her. He is suddenly killed by a horribly injured Buzzo, who renounced both of their evil actions.

Buzzo explains that he was formerly Lisa's lover, and blamed Brad for failing to prevent his father's abuse, which eventually led to Lisa's suicide. This is what made him torment Brad throughout The Painful. After insisting that Brad was Buddy's true father and a good man, he mutates due to his own secret Joy use, and commits suicide via biting off his own neck. The player then has to make a final choice. Buddy is due to mutate regardless of the player's Joy use. Buddy can choose to take or refuse the vaccine, which stops Joy's mutagenic effects. Either choice ends the game with a cutscene that changes depending on what was selected.

Development 
Prior to Lisa: The Painful, developer Austin Jorgensen had created his first game called Lisa: The First that saw release as freeware on October 9, 2012. This 2012 title is the first installment of the trilogy and stars Lisa as the protagonist. The original Lisa differs significantly from Painful, featuring a much greater emphasis on exploration and focuses on the relationship between the titular Lisa, a recurring character throughout the series, and her father Marty, both of whom appear within future installments of the series. The First has been described by Jorgensen as a "Yume Nikki ripoff", as it borrows significant influence from Yume Nikki in structure. Upon the 2014 game's release, both games received alternative names, Lisa: The First and Lisa: The Painful respectively, to distinguish them. According to Jorgensen, the original Lisa was inspired by a former relationship of his.

Lisa: The Painful was funded through Kickstarter with a goal of $7,000. The campaign was launched on November 14, 2013 and raised $16,492 from 847 people, reaching both of its stretch goals. Dingaling also developed the sequel expansion, Lisa: The Joyful, which features Buddy as its protagonist. Jorgensen has cited EarthBound as his main source of inspiration working on Lisa, drawing from both its art style and use of comic relief in a serious setting.

Reception 

Lisa received mostly positive reviews from critics. Praise was specifically given for the game's soundtrack, which was released as a separate download on Steam, along with an art collection featuring character profiles and concept drawings created by Chase Anast, the same man responsible for the Mother 4 project.

Lisa has received a handful of notable fangames, most notably LISA: The Pointless by Edvinas Kandrotas, and LISA: The Hopeful by a developer under the alias Taco Salad with help from other members of the community. Pointless and Hopeful (as well as all other fanmade efforts) are stated by Jorgensen to be canonical.

References

External links 
 

2014 video games
Child abuse in fiction
Child sexual abuse in fiction
Crowdfunded video games
Grief in fiction
Incest in fiction
Indie video games
Kickstarter-funded video games
Linux games
MacOS games
Patricide in fiction
Post-apocalyptic video games
RPG Maker games
Rape in fiction
Role-playing video games
Science fiction video games
Side-scrolling role-playing video games
Single-gender worlds
Single-player video games
Video games developed in the United States
Video games set in the United States
Weird fiction video games
Windows games
Works about atonement
Video games about suicide